To Have and to Hold is a 1922 American silent historical drama film. Based on the 1899 novel of the same name, the film was directed by George Fitzmaurice and starred Bert Lytell and Betty Compson.

To Have and to Hold is now considered lost.

Cast
 Betty Compson as Lady Jocelyn Leigh
 Bert Lytell as Captain Ralph Percy
 Theodore Kosloff as Lord Carnal
 William J. Ferguson as Jeremy Sparrow
 Raymond Hatton as King James I
 Claire Du Brey as Patience Worth
 Walter Long as Red Gill
 Anne Cornwall as Lady Jane Carr
 Fred Huntley as Paradise
 Arthur Rankin as Lord Cecil
 Lucien Littlefield as Duke of Buckingham

Other
The novel was first adapted for the screen in 1916. The 1916 version starred Mae Murray and Wallace Reid, and is also considered lost.

See also
List of lost films

References

External links

 
 
 To Have and to Hold at Virtual History
  lobby poster(GettyImages)

1922 films
1920s historical adventure films
1922 romantic drama films
American historical adventure films
American romantic drama films
American silent feature films
American black-and-white films
Famous Players-Lasky films
Films based on American novels
Films directed by George Fitzmaurice
Lost American films
Paramount Pictures films
Films with screenplays by Ouida Bergère
Remakes of American films
Films set in the 1620s
Films set in the Thirteen Colonies
Cultural depictions of James VI and I
Films set in London
1922 lost films
Lost romantic drama films
1920s American films
Silent romantic drama films
Silent historical adventure films
Silent American drama films